The University of Scranton Norsemen Rugby Football Club is a collegiate rugby union team at the University of Scranton. It competes in the Mid Atlantic Rugby Conference.

History
The Norsemen were chartered and founded as a club at the University of Scranton in 1985. The predecessor team was the "Scranton Stouts" started by two University of South Carolina students, Kevin Podlaski and Doug Morgan in 1981. The Norsemen enjoyed success through the 1990s and developed a reputation as a tough and physical team.

In 1999, due to off-field incidents and parental complaints, the Scranton Rugby team was stripped of its privilege to wear the school color –purple– and changed their uniform color to forest green. 

The team originated from students but was not "officially" affiliated with the school until it joined the EPRU in 1988–89, as the affiliation with a school was required even for NCAA club sports and it was the only way they could schedule games against other colleges. The colors were green and black, reverse quarters. 

As Division II probationary status in 1988 the team had a successful sean, winning the EPRU Division II therefore they earned the right to move up to Division I. The early 1990s proved to be a rather successful period for the team. Turning out almost 100 players each season.

Norsemen's most successful season was in the Spring of 1991, when finished the season with a 11-2-1 record. The 2 losses both occurred at an invitational tournament (Cherry Blossom) to eventual winner Maryland Terrapins by 4 points and to the Navy Midshipmen, losing a halftime lead to fall by 6 in the Plate Final –Navy won the tourney the following year. The tie was against PCOM, who at the time had not lost a match to a college or men's club in over two years.

Players achieved Select Side Status, All-American honors and many continued to play both domestically and internationally at the highest levels - Men's Club Div I National Champions, as well as national representative sides at venues such as the Hong Kong 7s, Dubai 7s, Wellington 7's, and other competitions.

Records & Highlights
The Norsemen went to their first playoff game in the fall of 1996, (see above - 1989 Fall defeated Millersville 27-18 in Harrisburg, PA) competing in Men's College Division I. Former team captain Robert P. Meuser went on to play with USA Division I team Long Island RFC.

Academics & community service
Although it competes at the intercollegiate level, Scranton Norsemen Rugby is officially a club sport. In addition to their many academic accomplishments, the Scranton ruggers fulfill regular service commitments to Habitat for Humanity, Lackawanna Housing and Development Corporation, and Hand-in-Hand. The club also regularly volunteers with Cinderella's Closet which allows girls of all ages to find dresses for Proms, Dances, and other functions at no cost. The club is also very active on The University of Scranton's campus in a wide variety of different volunteering functions.

References

External links
 

Scranton Royals rugby
Rugby clubs established in 1985
Eastern Pennsylvania Rugby Union
Rugby union teams in Pennsylvania
1985 establishments in Pennsylvania